is a city located in Kanagawa Prefecture, Japan. , the city had an estimated population of 101,670 and a population density of 1800 persons per km².

Geography
Isehara is located in the hilly center of Kanagawa Prefecture. A large portion of the city is within the Tanzawa-Ōyama Quasi-National Park.

Surrounding Municipalities
Kanagawa Prefecture
Atsugi
Hadano
Hiratsuka

Climate
Isehara has a Humid subtropical climate (Köppen Cfa) characterized by warm summers and cool winters with light to no snowfall.  The average annual temperature in Isehara is 14.6 °C. The average annual rainfall is 1906 mm with September as the wettest month. The temperatures are highest on average in August, at around 24.2 °C, and lowest in January, at around 2.9 °C.

Demographics
Per Japanese census data, the population of Isehara has grown steadily over the past 60 years.

History
The area of present-day Isehara City was part of several large shōen in Sagami Province during the Kamakura period. During the Edo period, it was nominally part of Odawara Domain, although large portions were tenryō territory controlled by the shōgun in Edo through various hatamoto.

On March 26, 1896, Ōsumi District and Yurugi District were merged to create Naka District. The town began to experience rapid growth after the opening of Isehara Station on the Odakyu Electric Railway on April 1, 1929. On December 21, 1954, the town expanded through merger with neighboring Oyama Town and three villages. Its area expanded further on September 30, 1956, through annexation of a portion of neighboring Okazaki Village. Isehara was elevated to city status on March 1, 1971.

Government
Isehara has a mayor-council form of government with a directly elected mayor and a unicameral city council of 20 members. Isehara contributes one member to the Kanagawa Prefectural Assembly. In terms of national politics, the city is part of Kanagawa 16th district of the lower house of the Diet of Japan.

Economy
Known primarily as a bedroom community for Yokohama and the greater Tokyo area, Isehara is also home to Amada Co,  a machine tool manufacturer and a number of manufacturing plants. It is also home to a Maru-Chan (Toyo Suisan) instant noodle factory.

Education
Isehara has ten public elementary schools and four public middle schools operated by the city government. The city has two public high schools operated by the Kanagawa Prefectural Board of Education, and the prefecture also operates one special education school for the handicapped. There is also one private high school. Tokyo-based Senshu University, Sanno University and Tokai University all have a campus within Isehara.

Transportation

Railway 
 Odakyu Electric Railway – Odakyū Odawara Line

Highway 
, to central Tokyo or Numazu

Sister City relations
 – Chino, Nagano, Japan, since January 21, 1986
 – La Mirada, California, United States, since September 21, 1981

Local attractions
Mount Ōyama

Notable people from Isehara
Ōta Dōkan, Sengoku period warlord
Saeko Shimazu, voice actress
Yoshiyuki Kamei, politician
Shinobu Yaguchi, film director and screenwriter
Zentaro Kamei, politician
Yasuhiro Kido, kickboxer
Shiho Yoshimura, former volleyball player

References

External links

Official Website 

 
Cities in Kanagawa Prefecture